Skerry Palanga is a Papua New Guinean rugby league coach who coached Papua New Guinea during the 1980s and 1990s.

Coaching career
Palanga first coached Papua New Guinea in 1982, in a match against the touring Kangaroo side. He took full time control of the side in 1988 and controlled the team in matches during the 1988 and 1989-1992 Rugby League World Cup.

Personal life
Palanga is the uncle of current Papua New Guinea coach Michael Marum.

References

Papua New Guinean rugby league coaches
Papua New Guinea national rugby league team coaches
Possibly living people
Year of birth missing